Abby Brammell (born March 19, 1979) is an American television and stage actress.

Early life and education
Brammell was born in Kentucky and raised in San Antonio, Texas, where she graduated from Churchill High School in 1997. She graduated from the Carnegie Mellon University drama school in 2001.

Career
Brammell has had recurring roles on Six Feet Under, The Shield, Push, Nevada, and Star Trek: Enterprise. In 2004, she received good reviews for her performance as Sabina Spielrein in the North American premier of Christopher Hampton's play, The Talking Cure, at the Mark Taper Forum in Los Angeles.

From 2006 to 2009, she appeared in The Unit as army wife Tiffy Gerhardt. She also appeared in NCIS season 8 episode three, "Short Fuse", as Marine Sergeant Heather Dempsey.

She played Tamara Moor in the  thriller Playdate (2012), a made-for-television film produced in the United States. She recently guest-starred on Medium, The Mentalist, Lie to Me, Criminal Minds and Castle.

She appeared as the wife of Steve Jobs, played by Ashton Kutcher, in the film Jobs (2013).

On October 11, 2015, it was announced Brammell would voice the female protagonist in Call of Duty: Black Ops III for Microsoft Windows, PlayStation 4, and Xbox One.

Personal life
On May 27, 2006, Brammell married screen actor Jake La Botz. They divorced in early 2008.

Filmography

Films

Television

Video game

References

External links
 
 
 Abby Brammell Bio at CBS - The Unit

1979 births
Actresses from Kentucky
Actresses from San Antonio
American film actresses
American stage actresses
American television actresses
Carnegie Mellon University College of Fine Arts alumni
Living people
21st-century American actresses